Charles Edward Frosst (1867–1948) was a Canadian businessman who founded the pharmaceutical company Charles E. Frosst & Co. in 1899 which was acquired by Merck & Co. in 1965 to become Merck Frosst Canada Inc.

Charles Frosst is interred in the Mount Royal Cemetery in Montreal.

External links
 Canada's Digital Collections profile

1867 births
1948 deaths
Canadian people of American descent
Canadian businesspeople
Place of birth missing
Burials at Mount Royal Cemetery